Penstemon clevelandii is a species of penstemon known by the common name Cleveland's beardtongue. It is native to southern California and Baja California, where it grows in mountain and desert habitat such as scrub, woodland, and chaparral. It is a perennial herb with upright, branching stems 70 centimeters in maximum height. The thick leaves are oval in shape, sometimes toothed, and 2 to 6 centimeters in length. The inflorescence produces tubular flowers with expanded, lipped mouths. The flower is pink to magenta in color, up to 2.4 centimeters in length, and somewhat glandular on the outer surface.

Its specific epithet clevelandii honors 19th-century San Diego-based plant collector and lawyer Daniel Cleveland.

There are three subtaxa recognized as varieties or subspecies.

References

External links

clevelandii
Flora of California
Flora of Baja California
Flora of the Sonoran Deserts
Natural history of the California chaparral and woodlands
Natural history of the Colorado Desert
Natural history of the Peninsular Ranges
Flora without expected TNC conservation status